The Legend of Heroes: Trails in the Sky is a 2004 role-playing video game developed by Nihon Falcom. The game is the first in what later became known as the Trails series, itself a part of the larger The Legend of Heroes series.

Trails in the Sky was first released in Japan for Windows and was later ported to the PlayStation Portable in 2006. North American video game publisher Xseed Games acquired the rights from Falcom, but did not release it until 2011 due to the game's large amount of text necessary to translate and localize. A high-definition port to the PlayStation 3 was released in 2012, while a remaster for the PlayStation Vita was released in 2015; both were only released in Japan. A direct sequel, Trails in the Sky SC, was released in 2006.

Gameplay

In Trails in the Sky, the player controls a cast of characters, embarking on quests to progress the story. There are two different types of maps when navigating the overworld, field maps and town maps. In field maps, enemies roam around and a battle ensues if the player comes into contact with one. In town maps, the player can visit various shops to purchase items, replenish health at an inn and, for the major cities, take on and report quests to the local guild. Quests can be a variety of tasks for the player, ranging from defeating monsters in the field map to delivering items and finding lost cats in town. In addition, the player can interact with numerous non-playable characters (NPCs). A unique aspect in Trails in the Sky is that each NPC's dialogue changes as the story progresses, allowing players to follow their accompanying side stories throughout the game.  The game features 8 playable characters, who apart from the protagonists Estelle and Joshua, rotate in and out of the party while playing the main story. The story itself is split into five different portions, with a prologue followed by four chapters.

Combat takes place on a grid and is turn-based. The character's turn order is determined by a tracker called the AT Bar. During the character's turn, the player can move or make an attack.  In addition to the normal attack, each character also has three other methods available for action: Arts, Crafts, and S-Crafts. Arts are magic spells characters can use to attack opponents or support teammates but must take an additional turn to cast. Crafts are character-specific abilities that are similar to Arts but can be used in the same turn; however, they utilize a special gauge called "Craft Points" (CP) for the cost to perform. S-Crafts are powered-up Crafts that can be performed once a character has over 100CP but completely depletes the CP gauge upon using it. Further extending S-Crafts are S-Breaks which allows characters to immediately perform an S-Craft regardless of when their turn order is. An additional aspect of combat is AT Bonuses which grant bonus effects at certain turns throughout the battle, visible on the AT Bar. If the player loses a battle, the game is over. The player is then allowed to continuously retry the battle and subsequently lower the difficulty of the battle for each retry. Earlier versions of the game included two difficulty settings, Normal and Hard, while later versions introduced a third difficulty known as Nightmare.

Synopsis
The game follows protagonists Estelle Bright and her adopted brother Joshua, who journey through the country of Liberl to train to become senior Bracers, members of a non-government multinational organization that acts to keep the peace and protect civilians. During the journey they get embroiled in and eventually stop an attempted coup to overthrow the monarchy.

During the celebratory party after the incident is resolved, Joshua encounters professor Alba, whom they met during their quest. Alba reveals that he is actually Georg Weissmann, a member of a secret crime organization called Ouroboros, who had been forcing Joshua to unknowingly act as their spy on the Bright family. After Weissman fully restores Joshua's memories, Joshua decides to leave the Bracer Guild to take on the society independently, but not before confessing his feelings to Estelle (while drugging her so he could not be followed).

Release 
Trails in the Sky was initially released for Windows on June 29, 2004, in Japan. The game was later ported to the PlayStation Portable and released in Japan on October 28, 2006. The PSP version was later released by Xseed Games in North America on March 29, 2011, and in Europe on November 4. The Windows version was released worldwide on July 29, 2014, and included a number of features from the PlayStation Portable version. A high-definition update, The Legend of Heroes: Trails in the Sky FC Kai HD Edition, was released for the PlayStation 3 in Japan on December 13, 2012.

A remaster, The Legend of Heroes: Trails in the Sky FC Evolution, was released in Japan for the PlayStation Vita on June 11, 2015. Evolution updates the user interface and incorporates new features such as voice acting, redesigned character portraits, and a new animated opening cutscene.

Localization 
The game was localized into English by Xseed Games, who had acquired the rights to bring the Trails in the Sky trilogy to North America in May 2010. The length of the script for Trails in the Sky FC, which contains approximately 1.5 million Japanese characters, presented a challenge for the team's editors. Jessica Chavez, the game's lead editor, spent nine months working on the script. Chavez stated that she would frequently work over 11-12 hours for six days a week. In 2013, Xseed planned a Windows version of Trails in the Sky to be released in early 2014, but coding issues forced the release date to be pushed back to July. According to Xseed localization programmer Sara Leen, much of the code needed to be rewritten from scratch because of technical differences between the PlayStation Portable and Windows versions; these changes frequently introduced new software bugs, further complicating matters.

Reception

Trails in the Sky received "generally favorable" reviews according to review aggregator Metacritic. Neilie Johnson of IGN gave it a positive review, stating that, though "First Chapter is not the most original ever made, like any good JRPG it offers amusing writing, dynamic combat, interesting tasks, an absorbing narrative, and hours upon hours of gameplay" and concluded that "while the game's 50/50 balance between combat and story may not be to everyone's taste, its charm and overall entertainment value make it well worth the investment". Hardcore Gamer praised the "rock-solid character writing", noting every character has "their own history, ambitions, and social connections", every non-player character (NPC) "has their own name and motivations and interpersonal relationships with other NPCs", and the influence of Hayao Miyazaki's classic anime film Castle in the Sky on the cast and steampunk setting. They also praised the open-ended story, quest design, and combat system, and for having "one of the most complete and enthralling worlds ever rendered", concluding it to be "one of the finest JRPGs in the history of the genre".

Despite the series's popularity in Japan, Trails in the Sky FC sold poorly in the West upon its initial release for the PSP, but was later ported to the Playstation Vita and PC, which USGamer's Kat Bailey described the game managing to jump to two platforms.

Notes

References

External links
 

2004 video games
Japanese role-playing video games
Kinema Citrus
Nihon Falcom games
PlayStation 3 games
PlayStation Portable games
PlayStation Vita games
Role-playing video games
Sentai Filmworks
Single-player video games
The Legend of Heroes
Trails (series)
Video games developed in Japan
Video games featuring female protagonists
Windows games
Xseed Games games
Ghostlight games